Ksenia Tsybutovich (born 26 June 1987) is a Russian football defender, currently playing for Zenit in the Russian Championship. She has won four league titles with Rossiyanka, Zvezda Perm and Ryazan.

She is a member of the Russian national team, and took part in the 2009 and 2013 European Championships. As an Under-19 international she won the 2005 U-19 Euro, where she scored the decisive goal in the final's penalty shootout.

Titles
 4 Russian Leagues (2006, 2009, 2010, 2013)
 4 Russian Cups (2006, 2008, 2012, 2014)

International career

References

1987 births
Living people
Russian women's footballers
Russia women's international footballers
WFC Rossiyanka players
Zvezda 2005 Perm players
Ryazan-VDV players
Footballers from Moscow
Russian Women's Football Championship players
Women's association football defenders
ZFK CSKA Moscow players
FC Chertanovo Moscow (women) players
21st-century Russian women